Miss Grand Malaysia is an annual female beauty pageant in Malaysia, founded by a Penang-based businessperson Anson Chong in 2013, aiming to select the country representative for Miss Grand International, which is an annual international beauty pageant promoting World Peace and against all kinds of conflicts. During 2015 to 2021, the contest was run by Introducing Talent Sdn Bhd, under the leadership of Jude Benjamin Lisa. Since 2022, the franchise has belonged to the Singapore-based start-up HyperLive Entertainment.

Malaysia holds a record of 3 placements at Miss Grand International in 2016, 2020, and 2021, the highest achievement was top 10 finalists in 2020, won by Jasebel Robert of Kuala Lumpur.

The current Miss Grand Malaysia is Charissa Chong of Selangor. She will represent her country at the upcoming Miss Grand International 2022 pageant held at Jakarta, Indonesia.

Background

History
The Miss Grand Malaysia beauty contest was founded in 2013 by Penang-based businessperson Anson Chong who ran the inaugural edition at Queensbay Mall in Bayan Lepas, featuring 12 national finalists representing all Malaysia states. Of which, Michelle Madeleine Boey from the host state was announced as the winner and won the prizes worth 10,000 RM During 2014 to 2016, no national pageant held to determine the winner, the country representatives for the international competition were designated by different national directors.

After three years of hiatus, the pageant was brought back in 2017 by a public relation and digital marketing consultant from Sarawak Jude Benjamin Lisa, who served as the national licensee for Miss Grand International in Malaysia during 2015 to 2021. Together with the business partner Josh Oneill, he also set up the event organizer privately held firm Introducing Talent Sdn Bhd to be responsible for managing the affiliated pageant, beginning with the second edition of Miss Grand Malaysia, in which Sanjeda John from Sabah was named the winner at a contest held at Evolve Concept Mall in Selangor on 5 August outclassing 15 other finalists. In the same event, the country representative for Miss Interncontinental 2017 was also crowned. Since then, the pageant has been held annually to select the Malaysian candidates for various international pageants including Miss Grand International until the organization lost the franchise to the Singapore-based start-up company HyperLive Entertainment Pte Ltd in 2022. The national titleholder for Miss Grand International has been determined through the Miss World Malaysia ever since. The event was organized by Fantastic Golden Sdn. Bhd., who was appointed by the Singaporean franchise holder company as its official partner to produce the event in Malaysia.

Since 2017, the organization has been franchising the state competitions to the individual organizers, who would name the state titleholders to compete in the national pageant. Beginning with three state pageants in 2017 including Sabah, Sarawak, and Kuala Lumpur, Melaka became the fourth member in 2018, while Selangor and Johor firstly joined the contest in 2019 and 2020, respectively. The organizer also planned to held the seventh-state pageant in Penang in 2022, but, unfortunately, lost the franchise to the HyperLive Entertainment.

Due to the COVID-19 pandemic, the pageant was virtually held for two consecutive years in 2020 and 2021. Originally, the organizer planned to conduct the 2020 physical contest at Bangi Avenue Convention Centre in late June, but postponed it twice, firstly to mid-October, and then to 30 January 2021.

Location and date
The following list is the edition detail of the Miss Grand Malaysia contest, since its inception in 2013.

Contestant selection

Since 2017, the national finalists' selection of the Miss Grand Malaysia has been operated via three systems, including (1) the multiplex regional pageant system, in which the state franchisee conducts several local pageants and casting events to determine the state finalists, or franchising the local competition to individual organizers, who would name their representative to compete at the state pageants.  (2) a simple regional pageant system, the state pageant is held to select the national finalists with no lower pageants or casting events, and (3) a central direct application through the national licensee, the organization then selects the candidates based on their profiles.

The winner, as well as the 1-2 runners-up of each state pageant, will automatically qualify to the national stage while other runners-up and some finalists candidates will be entered to the wild card round, in which the national organizer will then select the supplementary national candidates based on their discretion.

As of 2020, six states was held the state contest for the Miss Grand Malaysia, including:

Titleholders

National finalists
The following list is the national finalists of the Miss Grand Malaysia pageant, as well as the competition results.
Color keys
 Declared as the winner
 Ended as a runner-up 
 Ended as a semifinalist 
 Ended as a quarterfinalist 
 Did not participate

2013-2017, 2022: State titles assigned

2018-2021: State pageants

References

External links

 

Malaysia
Recurring events established in 2013
Beauty pageants in Malaysia